Prolinol is a chiral amino-alcohol that is used as a chiral building block in organic synthesis. It exists as two enantiomers: the D and L forms.

Preparation
Prolinol is obtained by reduction of the amino acid proline using lithium aluminium hydride. Because proline is cheaply available in high optical purity, enantiomerically pure prolinol is also widely available.

Use
Prolinol is used in broad variety of chemical reactions as chiral ligand, chiral catalyst or chiral auxiliary reagent in the Hajos–Parrish–Eder–Sauer–Wiechert reaction, the Baylis–Hillman reaction, Noyori type reactions and the Michael reaction.

See also
 Enantioselective synthesis

References

Primary alcohols
Pyrrolidines